Anthophila massaicae is a species of moth of the family Choreutidae. It is found in Kenya.

The larvae have been recorded feeding on Urtica massaica.

References

Endemic moths of Kenya
Choreutidae
Moths of Africa
Moths described in 2008